Lake Ripley is a lake in Meeker County, in the U.S. state of Minnesota.

Lake Ripley was named for Frederick N. Ripley, who died there of exposure during the winter of 1855.

See also
List of lakes in Minnesota

References

Lakes of Minnesota
Lakes of Meeker County, Minnesota